In mathematics, the Lumer–Phillips theorem, named after Günter Lumer and Ralph Phillips, is a result in the theory of strongly continuous semigroups that gives a necessary and sufficient condition for a linear operator in a Banach space to generate a contraction semigroup.

Statement of the theorem
Let A be a linear operator defined on a linear subspace D(A) of the Banach space X. Then A generates a contraction semigroup if and only if
 D(A) is dense in X,
 A is dissipative, and
 A − λ0I is surjective for some λ0> 0, where I denotes the identity operator.
An operator satisfying the last two conditions is called maximally dissipative.

Variants of the theorem

Reflexive spaces
Let A be a linear operator defined on a linear subspace D(A) of the reflexive Banach space X. Then A generates a contraction semigroup if and only if
 A is dissipative, and
 A − λ0I is surjective for some λ0> 0, where I denotes the identity operator. 
Note that the conditions that D(A) is dense and that A is closed are dropped in comparison to the non-reflexive case. This is because in the reflexive case they follow from the other two conditions.

Dissipativity of the adjoint
Let A be a linear operator defined on a dense linear subspace D(A) of the reflexive Banach space X. Then A generates a contraction semigroup if and only if
 A is closed and both A and its adjoint operator A∗ are dissipative.
In case that X is not reflexive, then this condition for A to generate a contraction semigroup is still sufficient, but not necessary.

Quasicontraction semigroups
Let A be a linear operator defined on a linear subspace D(A) of the Banach space X. Then A generates a quasi contraction semigroup if and only if
 D(A) is dense in X,
 A is closed,
 A is quasidissipative, i.e. there exists a ω ≥ 0 such that A − ωI is dissipative, and
 A − λ0I is surjective for some λ0 > ω, where I denotes the identity operator.

Examples
 Consider H = L2([0, 1]; R) with its usual inner product, and let Au = u′ with domain D(A) equal to those functions u in the Sobolev space H1([0, 1]; R) with u(1) = 0. D(A) is dense. Moreover, for every u in D(A),

 so that A is dissipative. The ordinary differential equation u' − λu = f, u(1) = 0 has a unique solution u in H1([0, 1]; R) for any f in L2([0, 1]; R), namely
 
 so that the surjectivity condition is satisfied. Hence, by the reflexive version of the Lumer–Phillips theorem A generates a contraction semigroup.

There are many more examples where a direct application of the Lumer–Phillips theorem gives the desired result.

In conjunction with translation, scaling and perturbation theory the Lumer–Phillips theorem is the main tool for showing that certain operators generate strongly continuous semigroups. The following is an example in point.

 A normal operator (an operator that commutes with its adjoint) on a Hilbert space generates a strongly continuous semigroup if and only if its spectrum is bounded from above.

Notes

References

 
  

Semigroup theory
Theorems in functional analysis